SCTN may refer to:

Stop Child Trafficking Now, a nonprofit organization
Chaitén Airfield (ICAO code: SCTN), a public-use airport in Chile